Shayera Thal, later married with the name Shayera Hol, is a fictional superheroine appearing in American comic books during the Silver Age of Comics published by DC Comics. The character was created by writer Gardner Fox and artist Joe Kubert, and first appeared in The Brave and the Bold #34 (March 1961). She is the second Hawkgirl and first Hawkwoman.

The character has since appeared in various media following her inception in the comics, most notably in the shows Justice League (2001-04) and Justice League Unlimited (2004-06), voiced by Maria Canals-Barrera.

Publication history
With the fading popularity of superheroes during the late 1940s, the Hawkman feature ended in the last issue of Flash Comics in 1949. In 1956, DC Comics resurrected the Flash by revamping the character with a new identity and backstory. Following the success of the new Flash, DC Comics revamped Hawkman in a similar fashion with The Brave and the Bold #34 in 1961. The Silver Age versions of Hawkman and Hawkgirl became married alien police officers from the planet Thanagar who come to Earth to study police techniques. Silver Age Hawkgirl is introduced as Shayera (phonetically identical to first Shierra, then Shiera Hall), who appears in costume as of her first appearance. Although Silver Age Hawkman joins the Justice League in Justice League of America #31 in 1964, Silver Age Hawkgirl was not offered membership because Justice League rules only allowed for one new member to be admitted at a time. Many years later, Silver Age Hawkgirl joined the Justice League of America with issue #146 in 1977. In 1981, Silver Age Hawkgirl changed her code name to Hawkwoman in the Hawkman backup feature of World's Finest Comics #272.

With the establishment of DC's multiverse system, the Golden Age Hawkgirl was said to have lived on Earth-Two and the Silver Age Hawkgirl on Earth-One.

Fictional character biography
Shayera Thal, The Silver Age version of Hawkgirl / Hawkwoman, was a law enforcement officer from the planet Thanagar and wife of Katar Hol, the Silver Age Hawkman and was a member of the Justice League of America.

She was born on Thanagar, which had a scientifically advanced civilization in which crime was virtually unknown. As an adolescent, Shayera Thal joined the Thanagarian police force and was assigned to assist the force's most decorated officer, Katar Hol, in capturing the Dragonfly Robbers. She introduces herself as "Policewoman Shayera Thal".  At first, Katar was furious at being assigned an inexperienced young woman as a partner, but he nevertheless became strongly attracted to her.

Together, they captured the Dragonfly Robbers in their stronghold found behind a waterfall; while on the case, Shayera saved Katar's life and the two fell deeply in love. A few weeks later, Katar proposed to Shayera in front of the same waterfall. She accepted and they were married. Ten years later, the couple was sent to Earth in pursuit of the criminal Byth Rok. Upon reaching Earth, they were befriended by Midway City police commissioner George Emmett, who established cover identities for them as Carter and Shiera Hall. After capturing Byth and bringing him back to their planet, Katar and Shayera chose to return to study Earth's crimefighting methods, and they fought against evil as the superheroes Hawkman and Hawkgirl. Shayera renamed herself Hawkwoman in the early 1980s.

As Hawkgirl, Shayera eventually joined her husband as a member of the Justice League. She was the first League member admitted as part of the League's vote to lift its prior twelve-member limitation. Her membership set precedent for the admission of Zatanna as the League's fifteenth member. Both Zatanna and Shayera became close friends since Hawkman vol. 2 #4.

As Shiera, she first worked as Carter's secretary, but later became co-director of the Midway City Museum. She has a sort of rivalry with the museum naturalist Mavis Trent, who has her eyes on both Hawkman and Carter Hall.

Later, Thanagar had established itself as a military dictatorship bent on conquering other planets. Hawkman and Hawkwoman thwarted Thanagarian plans to invade Earth, destroying their own starship in the process. Hawkman and Hawkwoman remain on Earth, regarded as traitors by everyone on Thanagar. She helped her husband come to terms with the deaths they caused during the battle. Eventually, she changed her codename to Hawkwoman.

Following the events of DC's miniseries, Crisis on Infinite Earths, the histories of Earth-One and Earth-Two are merged. As a result, both Golden Age and Silver Age versions of Hawkman and Hawkgirl/Hawkwoman live on the same Earth. Initially, the Silver Age Hawkman and Hawkwoman were kept in continuity unchanged. They took Superman to Krypton (now a gas planet), briefly joined Justice League International, teamed-up with Atom, and helped Animal Man defuse a Thanagarian bomb during Invasion. However, DC reversed this decision and rebooted Hawkman continuity after the success of the 1989 Hawkworld miniseries. Originally, Hawkworld retold the origins of Silver Age Hawkman and Hawkwoman. After becoming a success, DC Comics launched a Hawkworld ongoing series set in the present resulting in a complete reboot of Hawkman continuity. By doing so, several continuity errors regarding Hawkman and Hawkwoman's Justice League appearances needed to be fixed.

Following the Convergence storyline, Shayera Thal is featured in the Hawkman: Convergence. She is shown working as a curator in Gotham City museum while fighting as Hawkwoman also. At the end of the story her universe vanishes due to the Crisis happening, she is last seen flying with Hawkman.

DC Rebirth
Following Rebirth's continuity, Shayera Hol appeared in the Hawkman (vol. 5) series. She was shown in Thanagar alongside her partner Katar Hol. Later, Shayera appeared in the Justice League (vol. 2) issues #14-16 where she was shown as the empress of Thanagar Prime. Initially presenting herself as a friend and ally to the Justice League, she was revealed to be hiding many secrets from them, including a surviving Martian elder known as the Keep. It is revealed that Shayera used a device known as the Absorbacon and the Martian elder to create a fake construct of a restored Thanagar Prime, her people, and Katar Hol (the Savage Hawkman). After the death of the Martian elder, Shayera tries to keep her constructed reality from fading away but is unable to, saying goodbye to Katar one last time. It is revealed by Starman that the reason Shayera still exists despite being Kendra Saunders' immediate predecessor in their chain of resurrection is due to the Totality breaking said chain and splitting the two, making Shayera a completely independent being from Kendra. This was done by Perpetua as she feared what would happen if a whole Hawkgirl faced her at the end. Shayera assists the Justice League in their failed attempt to heal the Source Wall.

Shayera reappears in Justice League (vol. 2) #32, she is shown aboard a Thanagarian ship, trying to prevent Luthor from reaching the Anti-Monitor.

Shayera came back to Earth to help Carter Hall, who was infected by The Batman Who Laughs. As of that issue, Hawkwoman started acting as co-protagonist of the book alongside Hawkman.

Shayera is revealed to be the reincarnation of the Herald Shrra, a being akin to a biblical angel. She served an unnamed deity which had deemed the universe unworthy and condemned it to be destroyed by the Lord Beyond the Void. She sensed something that was good in Ktar Deathbringer, the original incarnation of Hawkman, and intervened in the deity's plans by appearing before Ktar in the aftermath of each battle, pushing him by guilt and shame to turn on the Lord Beyond the Void. As Ktar had made a bargain with the deity to reincarnate until he had saved as many people as he had killed, it punished Shrra for her defiance by stripping her of her divinity and condemning her to share his fate.

Hawkwoman teams up with Carter's old friends the Atom and Adam Strange to capture and cure Carter of his infection. They catch up to Sky Tyrant on an alien world where one of his previous incarnations named Titan Hawk had hidden an artifact known as "The Key" which would have released the Lord Beyond the Void. They recover the Key and imprison Sky Tyrant on Carter's starship. When she touches the Key, her memories of all her past lives are unlocked. Sky Tyrant manages to escape his cell and brawls with the three heroes, he and Shayera touch the Key together and are transported to the realm of the Lord Beyond the Void. In the process, Carter is cured of his infection (all infected heroes were cured by Lex Luthor in the Year of the Villain: Hell Arisen oneshot). The pair are attacked by Deathbringers who recognise Carter as Ktar, and, although the Deathbringers are defeated, they draw the attention of the Lord Beyond the Void.

The Lord easily overpowers them and binds them to a great stone monolith, planning to absorb the energy from all their lives, which will give him sufficient power to cross over into the universe. Carter and Shayera release the power of their thousands of lives, overloading and destroying the Lord, while also killing themselves. They awake in the afterlife, reverted to Ktar and Shrra. The deity explains that Ktar's debt is repaid, and offers to allow him to pass on and to restore Shrra as a Herald, however, the two do not wish to be parted. Therefore, the deity offers them another reward, to be reincarnated a final time in their favourite lives, where they will be extremely long lived but mortal. The two agree and are restored to life in the 1940s as the Golden Age Hawkman and Hawkgirl and reunite with their old friends in the Justice Society of America.

During a fight with the Injustice Society, Carter freezes with fear at a moment when the villains have the upper hand. Shayera throws her mace into Carter's, creating an explosion which incapacitates the Injustice Society and turns the tide of the fight. The JSA assumes Carter was simply providing a distraction for Shayera, but he privately admits to her that now he is mortal, he fears dying. Meanwhile, Anton Hastor, an incarnation of the Hawks' ancient enemy Hath-Set, learns that Prince Khufu and Chay-Ara have been reincarnated, and this time, they can be killed permanently. Hastor steals his Nth Metal dagger from JSA headquarters and draws the Hawks out to a train where he has killed the passengers and resurrected them as zombies. Shayera is tackled off the train by zombies while Hastor attacks Carter, who is too fearful to fight back until Hastor threatens Shayera. Carter disarms Hastor by stabbing himself with the dagger just as Shayera catches up to the train and destroys the dagger. Shayera spends the following centuries as a hero alongside Carter, surviving into the 40th Century.

Shayera appeared as a member of the Justice Society of America in the Dark Crisis event.

Powers and abilities

Other versions

Elsewords
Shayera and Katar are featured in the Elseworlds three-part series Legend of the Hawkman (2000). The story takes place in the Earth-One timeline, some time after The Brave and the Bold #34. She is shown wanting to return home to Thanagar while Katar has grown accustomed to life on Earth. Although this mini-series was never labelled as an Elseworlds project when originally published, it is now accepted as being one, with this story clearly based on the Silver Age versions of Hawkman and Hawkgirl during the pre-Crisis on Infinite Earths era.

Legend of the Hawkman
Hawkgirl (Shayera Hol) and Hawkman feature in this mini-series set soon after their arrival on Earth as the duo faces an ancient menace with connections to their Thanagarian heritage. In the first chapter, "The Fallen One", Shayera has been anxious to return to Thanagar, but Katar feels a responsibility to the museum, especially its upcoming extraterrestrial treasure exhibit. While Katar has adopted Earth as his home Shayera doesn't feel like they belong there. In Tibet a group of archaeologists discovers a Thanagarian gateway carved into a cliff side, after being informed of this Hawkgirl and Hawkman travel to the location.

Hawkman deciphers the writing on the gateway and it depicts the life of Thasaro, a Thanagarian child so evil that he threatened the existence of Thanagar's ancient gods. The ancient gods of Aerie condemned Thasaro into a mystic urn. Shayera's ancestor was entrusted with burying the urn so no one could release Thasaro. The archeologists and Katar want to examine the gateway but Shayera insists that the gateway be left alone. Hawkman and Shayera get into a fight until Shayera flies away heartbroken because Katar cares more about archeology than her feelings. Katar's fingerprints genetically opens the gateway. Shayera hears an explosion and heads back to the site. Thasaro appears and makes the stone sentries throughout his chamber come to life. The sentries attack Hawkgirl but she manages to defeat his enforcers and finds Katar within Thasaro's grip. Thasaro then summons corpses like talons that rise up from the ground and pull Hawkgirl into a cavern beneath Thasaro's chamber. The talons maim Hawkgirl, but she manages to break away. Shayera's distress in the cavern awakens the spirit of her ancestor. Shayera's ancestor channels his aura into Shayera and gives her the edge she needs to subdue Thasaro. Thasaro is banished once again into the urn. The urn is then transported to the Midway City Museum so Katar and Shayera can safeguard it. Three months later Shayera is shown wanting to start a family, in the meantime Thanagarian zealots return to Earth to free the heinous fallen god. Thasaro's return brings chaos and devastation to Midway City, but using their Nth Metal weapons Hawkgirl and Hawkman are able to subdue him, banishing him to the fiery depths of Earth's Hell.

JLA: The Nail & JLA: Another Nail
In JLA: The Nail and JLA: Another Nail, Hawkgirl is a member of a Justice League, and remains so even after her husband's death by Amazo, although the team faces anti-alien prejudice and suspicion. She briefly contemplates abandoning Earth when anti-alien propaganda leads to a museum exhibit dedicated to Hawkman being vandalized, but when she returns to save two children from a burning building, her faith in humanity is restored when a group of civilians stand between her and government officials attempting to bring her in as an alien, the family she saved affirming that they still see Hawkman and her as heroes. In Another Nail, she appears to be close friends with Zatanna. She has forgiven Oliver Queen (in Amazo's body) after he admits feeling responsible for getting Katar killed, Queen believing that his attempts to prove himself caused Hawkman to put himself in danger to project the more vulnerable Oliver. Her role as the sole Hawk with League membership is much like her animated counterpart in the Justice League animated series.

Batman: The Dark Knight Strikes Again
In Batman: The Dark Knight Strikes Again, the Hawks tried to return to Thanagar to flee from Lex Luthor's military dictatorship, only to crash in the rain forests of Costa Rica. They decided to remain in hiding. They gave birth to a son and daughter, giving them natural wings. Katar and Shayera were killed in a military strike ordered by Lex Luthor, embracing each other in their final moments. The children were brought up in the jungle ever since. They were bent on revenge against Lex. As Hawkboy, the son ultimately kills Lex with Batman's permission, since he understands what he has been through.

Justice
In Alex Ross's Silver Age-toned Justice, Hawkgirl is a member of the Justice League and co-director of the Midway City Museum, alongside her husband. With the entire JLA's secrets and weaknesses in hand, the Legion of Doom stages a simultaneous attack on nearly every member of the League. Hawkgirl and Hawkman are surprised by Toyman in the Midway City Museum, but manage to survive and decide to investigate his warehouse, where they are assaulted by his forces, and discover that he is making multiple Brainiac androids. She also appears in Secret Origins and Liberty and Justice.

DC New Talents Showcase
Hawkgirl was chosen for one of the seven features in the one-shot comic book. She lives in Chicago, working as a police detective. She is from Thanagar, her mace vibrates like a smartphone when Nth-Metal Thanagarian weapons are near and she has a secret Hawkroom. It is revealed that she did not leave Thanagar on good terms, after some time collecting Thanagarian weapons from crime scenes she started suspecting something was wrong. This led to her fighting against an ancient Thanagarian that wanted her dead since she chose humans instead of Thanagarians.

Erica Schultz, said she was inspired by Justice League version of the character, "I've always been drawn to strong characters, but what really solidified my love for Shayera was the Justice League cartoon show."

Scooby-Doo Team-Up #33
During a crossover with the cast of Scooby-Doo, Silver Age version of Hawkgirl is featured alongside Hawkman in the Midway City Museum, working as curators. The heroes team-up with the characters from the animated series to discover who were stealing from their workplace. Later they uncover that Shadow Thief, Matter Master and Fadeaway Man were behind it. After a fight against the villains the heroes retrieve the stolen items. Like Shiera Sanders Hall, Shayera is a reincarnation of Prince Khufu's consort Chay-Ara, and have been reborn as Lady Celia (love of Silent Knight) and Cinnamon (love of Nighthawk).

Justice League Infinity
Shayera is a core member of the new Justice League series, Justice League Infinity, written by James Tucker and J.M. DeMatteis. The new series serves as a continuation to Justice League Unlimited, as the League band together to face new dangers that not only threaten Earth, but the multiverse itself.

In other media

Television
 Shayera Hol / Hawkgirl appears in The All-New Super Friends Hour, voiced by Shannon Farnon.
 Shayera Hol / Hawkgirl appears in Super Friends, voiced by Janet Waldo.

 Shayera Hol / Hawkgirl appears in series set in the DC Animated Universe (DCAU), voiced by Maria Canals-Barrera. The series producers reworked this version's personality to contrast with Wonder Woman and included her over Black Canary so that a member of the "Hawk family" was represented. As a member of the Thanagarian Armed Forces, Shayera wields an Nth metal mace capable of disrupting magical and energy-based forces and is an expert hand-to-hand combatant. She came to Earth as an advance scout and spy for the Thanagarian military.
 Shayera first appears in Justice League. In the three-part series premiere "Secret Origins", she becomes a founding member of the Justice League after they join forces to fend off an alien invasion of Earth. Throughout the series, Shayera maintains a distant relationship with the League, but develops a brother/sister bond with the Flash and a romantic relationship with John Stewart / Green Lantern. In the three-part series finale "Starcrossed", Shayera reveals her true colors after her people arrive to gain Earth's support in their war with the Gordanians. She initially rejoins her kind as well as her commanding officer and fiancé Hro Talak, which creates a rift between her and Stewart. When she learns of their plan to attack the Gordanians' homeworld by destroying Earth, she betrays her people and returns to the Justice League to inform them. The League eventually defeat the Thanagarians, who leave Shayera behind as a traitor. While the Justice League vote to decide whether she should stay on the team, she resigns before hearing their verdict.
 Additionally, an alternate universe version who is a member of the Justice Lords appears in the two-part episode "A Better World".
 Shayera also appears in the Static Shock two-part episode "A League of Their Own", which takes place during Justice League and prior to "Starcrossed". She and the League join forces with Static and Gear to defeat Brainiac after he rebuilds himself in the League's Watchtower.
 Shayera also appears in Justice League Unlimited. Following her departure from the League, she came to stay with Doctor Fate and his wife Inza Nelson in the former's tower stronghold in an effort to decide what to do with her life. In the episode "Wake the Dead", she rejoins the League and learns that they allowed her to stay, but continues to experience friction, particularly from Wonder Woman, Batman, and Stewart's new girlfriend Vixen. In particular, Wonder Woman holds a grudge against Shayera until the episode "The Balance", when she is forced to take Shayera to Themyscira and Tartarus after Felix Faust usurps Hades's throne and the two Leaguers settle their differences. In the episode "Hunter's Moon", Shayera, Vixen, and Vigilante are assigned to a rescue mission on a distant moon, but are met with Thanagarians who blame Shayera for the Gordanians defeating them following her betrayal. While Shayera is tempted to turn herself in, her teammates refuse to let her go. Following this, Shayera and Vixen work out their differences as well, with the former discovering she still has feelings for Stewart, who decides to remain with Vixen but tells Shayera of their future son Warhawk. By the series finale "Destroyer", Shayera and Stewart resolve to remain friends. Series creator Bruce Timm said in an interview that while he was deliberately ambiguous about the future of their relationship and understood some fans disliked where it was left at the series finale, it was his opinion that "You can put two and two together and imagine what happens".

Film
 Shayera Hol makes a cameo appearance in Justice League: The New Frontier.
 Shayera Hol appears in Teen Titans Go! To the Movies.
 Shayera Hol / Hawkgirl was originally going to appear in Black Adam, but was ultimately cut.
 Shayera Hol appears in Green Lantern: Beware My Power, voiced by Jamie Gray Hyder.

Video games
 Shayera Hol appears as a playable character in Justice League: Injustice for All.
 Shayera Hol appears as a playable character in Justice League: Chronicles.
 A variation of Shayera Hol / Hawkgirl resembling Kendra Saunders appears in DC Universe Online, voiced by Lana Lesley.
 Shayera Hol appears as a modifier in Injustice 2s "Multiverse" mode.
 Shayera Hol appears as a playable character in Lego DC Super-Villains, voiced by Tiffany Smith.

Miscellaneous
 The DCAU incarnation of Shayera Hol / Hawkgirl appears in Justice League Adventures and Justice League Beyond. In the latter, she rekindles her relationship with John Stewart after Vixen is murdered by the Shadow Thief and go on to get married, have a son named Rex Stewart, and retire from the Justice League to focus on raising him.
 Shayera Hol / Hawkgirl appears in All-New Batman: The Brave and the Bold.

References

External links

Comics characters introduced in 1961
Characters created by Gardner Fox
Comics spin-offs
DC Comics aliens
DC Comics American superheroes
DC Comics fantasy characters
DC Comics female superheroes
DC Comics characters with accelerated healing
DC Comics characters with superhuman senses
DC Comics characters with superhuman strength
DC Comics extraterrestrial superheroes
DC Comics police officers
Fictional archaeologists
Fictional characters with death or rebirth abilities
Fictional characters with immortality
Fictional women soldiers and warriors
Golden Age superheroes
Fiction about reincarnation
Wingmen of Thanagar
Hawkgirl